Gordon Stanley Kino (June 15, 1928, Melbourne, Australia – October 9, 2017, Stanford, California) was an Australian-British-American inventor and professor of electrical engineering and applied physics. He is known for "inventing new microscopes that improved semiconductor manufacturing and transformed medical diagnostics." His dual-axis confocal microscope has several advantages over the single-axis confocal microscope.

Biography
Born in Australia, Kino grew up in London. At the University of London he graduated with a B.Sc. in 1952 and an M.Sc. in mathematics in 1954. At Stanford University he graduated in 1955 with a Ph.D. in electrical engineering. His dissertation Perturbation theory of transmission systems was supervised by Marvin Chodorow. In October 1955 in San Francisco, Gordon Kino married Dorothy Beryl Lovelace, who was a former Londoner that he met in California. Their daughter, Carol Ann Kino, was born in December 1956. From 1956 to 1957 he worked at Bell Labs in Murray Hill, New Jersey. At Stanford University he held a research position from 1957 to 1961, joined the faculty of the department of electrical engineering in 1961, and was promoted to full professor in 1965, officially retiring as professor emeritus in 1997. He became in 1967 a naturalized U.S. citizen and for the academic year 1967–1968 held a Guggenheim fellowship.

Kino is credited with at least 119 U.S. patents. He did research on "microwave triodes, traveling wave tubes, klystrons, microwave tubes, magnetrons, electron guns, wave propagation in plasmas, solid-state oscillators and amplifiers, microwave acoustics, and acoustic imaging devices for medical instrumentation and nondestructive testing." His research helped in the 1990s to greatly improve data storage. At Stanford he was one the pioneers of interdisciplinary research and development for technological innovation. Along with Calvin Quate and Herbert John Shaw, he was one of the most important members of Stanford's Ginzton Laboratory and its director from 1994 to 1996. Kino was the author or co-author of over 400 technical articles.

Among Kino's papers stored at Stanford University, there is a photograph album of Kino's 1997 retirement party.

He was the advisor or co-advisor for more than 70 doctoral dissertations. His doctoral students include John E. Bowers, Peter T. Kirstein, and Miklos Porkolab.

Kino was elected in 1976 a member of the National Academy of Engineering. He was elected a fellow of the Institute of Electrical and Electronics Engineers, of the American Physical Society, and of the American Association for the Advancement of Science.

In the last years of his life, Kino suffered from Parkinson's disease. Upon his death in 2017 he was survived by his widow and their daughter.

Selected publications

Articles
 
 
 
 
 
 
  (over 900 citations)
 
 
 
 
 
  (over 750 citations)
  (over 1200 citations)

Books

References

External links
 

1928 births
2017 deaths
Scientists from Melbourne
Australian inventors
British inventors
American inventors
Australian electrical engineers
British electrical engineers
American electrical engineers
Fellows of the American Association for the Advancement of Science
Fellows of the American Physical Society
Fellow Members of the IEEE
Alumni of the University of London
Stanford University alumni
Stanford University School of Engineering faculty
Members of the United States National Academy of Engineering